The 1995-96 Azerbaijan Top League was the fifth season of the Azerbaijan Top League and was contested by 11 clubs and was the first season were 3 points were awarded for a win. Kəpəz were the defending champions but were unable to keep their title as Neftchi Baku completed a domestic double, winning their second Azerbaijan League title and the Azerbaijan Cup.

Stadia and locations

Note: Table lists in alphabetical order.

First round

League table

Results

Second round

Championship group

Results

Relegation group

Results

Season statistics

Top scorers

References

External links
1995-96 RSSSF
APL Stats

Azerbaijan Premier League seasons
Azer
1995–96 in Azerbaijani football